Hammond is an unincorporated community in Robertson County, Texas, United States. Hammond is located on Texas State Highway 6 north of Calvert and south of Bremond.

History
Hammond was originally the site of two plantations purchased by Dr. B.F. Hammond in 1853. After the Civil War, Hammond became a small community which primarily served former slaves from the plantation. In 1869, the Houston and Texas Central Railway built a station in Hammond. Hammond had a post office from 1870 until the 1930s. The population from 1970 to 2000 was estimated as 44.

References

Unincorporated communities in Robertson County, Texas
Unincorporated communities in Texas
Bryan–College Station